Jeff Choquette (born December 22, 1986) is an American professional stock car racing driver. Grandson of 1954 NASCAR Modified champion Jack Choquette, he currently competes part-time in the ASA Midwest Tour.

Racing career

A native of The Acreage, Florida, Choquette began his racing career at age 8 in kart racing; he moved to stock car racing at age 11, and in 2004 he won the Florida Governor's Cup 200 at New Smyrna Speedway, becoming the youngest winner ever of the event. Choquette also played baseball in high school but chose to concentrate on a racing career.

In 2005, Choquette participated in Roush Fenway Racing's Roush Racing: Driver X reality show, competing for a Truck Series ride with the team. The youngest of 25 drivers in the competition, he failed to make the cut. In 2007, competing in the ASA Late Model Series, Choquette won the South Division championship. In 2009 he won the World Crown 300 at Gresham Motorsports Park, but was disqualified after his car failed post-race inspection.

Choquette currently competes in the ASA Midwest Tour; he scored his first win in the series in 2011 at Iowa Speedway. In 2012 he made his Camping World Truck Series debut at Iowa Speedway in July, driving the No. 97 Chevrolet for the Adrian Carriers Racing Team; he drove to 11th place in his first event in the series. Choquette also drove for the team in the ARCA Racing Series at the Illinois State Fairgrounds in August, finishing 25th in his debut race, before returning to the Camping World Truck Series in its second race of the year at Iowa Speedway in September, finishing 8th in the event; Choquette would race once more in the series in 2012, at Phoenix International Raceway, finishing 30th after an accident.

Motorsports career results

NASCAR
(key) (Bold – Pole position awarded by qualifying time. Italics – Pole position earned by points standings or practice time. * – Most laps led.)

Camping World Truck Series 

 Season still in progress 
 Ineligible for series points

ARCA Racing Series
(key) (Bold – Pole position awarded by qualifying time. Italics – Pole position earned by points standings or practice time. * – Most laps led.)

References

External links
 

Living people
1986 births
People from Palm Beach County, Florida
Sportspeople from the Miami metropolitan area
Racing drivers from Florida
NASCAR drivers
ARCA Menards Series drivers
ARCA Midwest Tour drivers